This is a list of villages and settlements in Zamfara State, Nigeria organised by local government area (LGA) and district/ward.

By postal code

Below is a list of villages and settlements organised by postal code.

By electoral ward
Below is a list of polling units, including villages and schools, organised by electoral ward.

References

Zamfara
Zamfara State